Equestrian competitions were contested by participating nations at the 1987 Pan American Games.

Events

Medal table

See also 
 Equestrian at the 1988 Summer Olympics

References 
  .
 

Events at the 1987 Pan American Games
1987
1987 in equestrian
Equestrian sports competitions in the United States